is a Japanese manga series written and illustrated by Nobuyuki Anzai. It has been serialized in Shogakukan's shōnen manga magazine Shōnen Sunday S since February 2018.

Publication
Uruha no Sekai de Arisugawa, written and illustrated by Nobuyuki Anzai, started in Shogakukan's shōnen manga magazine Shōnen Sunday S on February 23, 2018. Shogakukan has collected its chapters into individual tankōbon volumes. The first volume was released on October 18, 2018. As of February 16, 2023, seven volumes have been released.

Volume list

References

External links
Official website at Web Sunday Every 

Comedy anime and manga
Fantasy anime and manga
Shogakukan manga
Shōnen manga